Seth Morrison is a professional skier. He has won many competitions and has appeared in a number of ski movies. He is best known for jumping off cliffs from extreme heights.

Early life
. He moved to Vail, Colorado in 1984 where he lived throughout Middle and High School. As a child he lived with his mom, a surgical nurse.

Career
During his years of skiing, Morrison competed on large mountains throughout the world, including doing back-flips off 100-foot cliffs. He has been interviewed on television several times. Morrison was sponsored by K2 skis in 1992 and was fired by K2 Skis in 2016, during which time the company produced several models of skis bearing his namesake.  Full Tilt Ski boots released him while he had a pro model bearing his name after many seasons of having such promodels.  Oakley released him while he had a pro model goggle and outwear bearing his name after many seasons of having said products.  Hestra gloves released him while having a pro model glove after many seasons of having such gloves.

Awards and competitions
 2009 Powder Video Awards, Best Natural Air-Winner.
 2009 Powder Video Awards, Reader Poll- Winner.
 2009 Powder Video Awards, Full Throttle- Winner.
 2008 Powder Video Awards, Reader Poll- Winner.
 2008 Fri Flyt Awards, International Athlete
 2007 Powder Video Awards, Best Natural Air- Winner.
 2007 Powder Video Awards, Reader Poll- Winner.
 2006 Powder Video Awards, Reader Poll- Third Place.
 2005 Powder Video Awards, Reader Poll- Second Place.
 2004 Powder Video Awards, Reader Poll- Winner.
 2004 Powder Video Awards, Best Cliff Huck.
 2003 Powder Video Awards, Full Throttle- Winner.
 2003 Powder Video Awards, Reader Poll- Winner.
 2002 Powder Video Awards, Reader Poll- Winner.
 2001 Powder Video Awards, Best Male Performance- Winner.
 2001 Poacher's Freeski Film Festival, Best Rider -Winner (in Ski Movie).

Competition results
 2000-2001 - Competitor in U.S. Extreme Freeskiing Championships. ESPN and ESPN 2
 1999-2000 - Competitor in Johnny Moseley Invitational. NBC
 1998-1999 - 8th place in Skier Cross in the X Games at Crested Butte. ESPN, ESPN 2, and ABC
 1998-1999 - 12th place in Johnny Moseley Invitational. NBC
 1998 - 9th place in the Canadian Freeskiing Championships in Whistler/Blackcomb
 1991 - 2nd place in the U.S. National Extremes (age 19)

Filmography
 2013 - Tracing Skylines, produced by Poor Boyz Productions (PBP)
 2012 - The Dream Factory, produced by Teton Gravity Research (TGR)
 2011 - The Ordinary Skier, produced by Oakley
 2011 - One For The Road, produced by Teton Gravity Research (TGR)
 2010 - Light the Wick, produced by Teton Gravity Research (TGR)
 2009 - Re:session, produced by Teton Gravity Research (TGR)
 2008 - Under the Influence, produced by Teton Gravity Research (TGR)
 2007 - Lost and Found, produced by Teton Gravity Research (TGR)
 2007 - Steep, produced by Mark Obenhaus
 2007 - Believe, produced by Constantine Papanicolaou
 2007 - Deep Winter, produced by Gigantic Pictures (stunts for a motion picture)
 2006-2007 Anomaly, produced by Teton Gravity Research (TGR)
 2006-2007 Ski Porn!, produced by Poor Boyz Productions (PBP)
 2005-2006 Stars, Skis, and Hucks, produced by Chainsaw Productions
 2005-2006 War, produced by Poor Boyz (PBP)
 2005-2006 Show and Prove, produced by Studio 411
 2005-2006 Higher Ground, produced by Warren Miller Entertainment (WME)
 2004-2005 Yearbook, produced by Matchstick Productions (MSP)
 2003-2004 Focused, produced by Matchstick Productions (MSP)
 2003 - Keep Your Eyes Open, produced by Artisan Entertainment and Leisure Time Productions
 2002-2003 Ski Movie III: The Front Line, produced by Matchstick Productions (MSP)
 2001 - Ski Movie II: High Society, produced by Matchstick Productions (MSP)
 2002 - Storm, produced by Warren Miller Entertainment (WME)
 2000-2001 Cold Fusion,  produced by Warren Miller Entertainment (WME)
 2000 - Ski Movie, produced by Matchstick Productions (MSP)
 1999 - Global Storming, produced by Matchstick Productions (MSP)
 1993 - Black Diamond Rush by Warren Miller

Promodels
Morrison has had a number different 'promodel' products with his sponsors K2 Skis, Full Tilt Ski Boots, Hestra Gloves and Oakley. Morrison's two promodel skis with K2 Skis are the Obsethed and new for the 2012/2013 season the SideSeth. The Obsethed has undergone much change since the original Obsethed, the last model of the Obsethed was released for the 2011/2012 season. The Obsethed was then replaced by the SideSeth, which featured a more directional rocker profile and being in K2's Adventure category was marketed more at the backcountry skier than the Obsethed. However the SideSeth has experienced much success with inbounds skiers also. Morrison's promodel with Full Tilt boots is the Seth Morrison Pro Boot, it features the second stiffest flex tongue available from Full Tilt (8 Flex), and a number of distinctive aesthetic features chosen by Seth. The boot is marketed at all mountain and freeride/big mountain skiers, and thus it is important to note it was the first boot from Full Tilt to feature the rubber sole as stock for the 2012/2013 season. Seth Morrison's has also had a number of promodel outerwear suits from Oakley.

References

External links
Seth Morrison Official Blog
Profile at Teton Gravity Research
Interview from Mountainzone.com

NewWest Interview With Seth Morrison (2006)

People from Summit County, Colorado
1973 births
Living people
American male alpine skiers
American freeskiers
Extreme skiers
People from Murray, Kentucky